Robert Breuler is an American stage actor, primarily known as a longtime ensemble member of the Steppenwolf Theatre Company, in Chicago, Illinois, where he won a Joseph Jefferson Award for his role as a Russian negotiator in A Walk in the Woods.

Breuler has appeared in over 40 shows at Steppenwolf. He has also appeared on Broadway and on screen, most notably as Judge John Hathorne in The Crucible (1996 film).

References

External links
Steppenwolf

American male stage actors
Living people
Year of birth missing (living people)
Steppenwolf Theatre Company players